Smartsville is a census-designated place in Yuba County, California, United States, in the foothills of the Sierra Nevada. It is one of the many historic towns in California's gold country, and is today a California Historical Landmark. The population was 177 at the 2010 census.

History
Smartsville is named for James Smart, a local hotel proprietor during the days of the Gold Rush. In the spring of 1856, Smart built a hotel.

Extensive placer mining tailings remain throughout the area.

A post office was opened at Smartville in 1865. Due to a ruling by the U.S. Post Office Department (now the U.S. Postal Service), Smartsville became Smartville in 1909; this change was strengthened by a similar ruling by the United States Board on Geographic Names in 1947. In August 2008, after petitions from residents to restore the original name, the Board on Geographic Names ruled in favor of the form "Smartsville".  The town and name change were featured in an episode of California's Gold with Huell Howser.

The Smartville Cemetery is a historic cemetery.

Geology 
Smartville gave its name to the Smartville Block, a co-extensive oceanic geologic terrane formed by plate tectonics in the western foothills of the central Sierra Nevada and west into the Central Valley. The presence of gold in the Mother Lode Gold Country was found to coincide with the suture line of the Smartville Block terrane and the North American Plate.

Geography
According to the United States Census Bureau, the CDP covers an area of 0.7 square miles (1.9 km), all of it land.

Climate
According to the Köppen Climate Classification system, Smartsville has a warm-summer Mediterranean climate, abbreviated "Csa" on climate maps.

Demographics
The 2010 United States Census reported that Smartsville had a population of 177. The racial makeup of Smartsville was 157 (88.7%) White, 0 (0.0%) African American, 5 (2.8%) Native American, 0 (0.0%) Asian, 0 (0.0%) Pacific Islander, 9 (5.1%) from other races, and 6 (3.4%) from two or more races. Hispanic or Latino of any race were 18 persons (10.2%).

The Census reported that 177 people (100% of the population) lived in households, 0 (0%) lived in non-institutionalized group quarters, and 0 (0%) were institutionalized.

There were 59 households, out of which 21 (35.6%) had children under the age of 18 living in them, 25 (42.4%) were opposite-sex married couples living together, 6 (10.2%) had a female householder with no husband present, 11 (18.6%) had a male householder with no wife present.  There were 10 (16.9%) unmarried opposite-sex partnerships, and 0 (0%) same-sex married couples or partnerships. 13 households (22.0%) were made up of individuals, and 6 (10.2%) had someone living alone who was 65 years of age or older. The average household size was 3.00.  There were 42 families (71.2% of all households); the average family size was 3.24.

The population was spread out, with 50 people (28.2%) under the age of 18, 14 people (7.9%) aged 18 to 24, 42 people (23.7%) aged 25 to 44, 43 people (24.3%) aged 45 to 64, and 28 people (15.8%) who were 65 years of age or older.  The median age was 38.3 years. For every 100 females, there were 101.1 males.  For every 100 females age 18 and over, there were 101.6 males.

The homeowner vacancy rate was 0%; the rental vacancy rate was 5.6%.  126 people (71.2% of the population) lived in owner-occupied housing units and 51 people (28.8%) lived in rental housing units.

Notable resident
James Wesley Rawles, writer

See also 
 California Historical Landmarks in Yuba County, California
 Timbuctoo, California

References

External links 
 Smartsville Historic Church history

Census-designated places in Yuba County, California
Populated places in the Sierra Nevada (United States)
Census-designated places in California